Velázquez, also Velazquez, Velásquez or Velasquez, is a surname from Spain. It is a patronymic name, meaning "son of Velasco".

References to "Velazquez" without a first name are often to the Spanish painter, Diego – see below.

Notable people with this surname include:

Arts
Consuelo Velázquez, 20th-century Mexican songwriter, best known for "Bésame mucho"
Daniel Velazquez, Puerto Rican rock guitarist
Diego Velázquez, Spaniard court painter to Philip IV of Spain, most famous for Las Meninas
Diego Velazquez (actor), American TV and film child actor
Héctor Velázquez Moreno, Mexican architect
Valerie Velazquez American singer, philanthropist
Jaci Velasquez, American contemporary Christian singer
Jesus Velasquez, fictional character in True Blood
Lorena Velázquez (born 1937), Mexican actress
Mark Velasquez (born 1977), American photographer
Nadine Velazquez, Puerto Rican-American actress and model
Patricia Velásquez (born 1971), Venezuelan actress and model
Regine Velasquez (born 1970), Filipina singer-songwriter, actress, and record producer
Tony Velasquez (1910–1997), Filipino illustrator

Politics
Andrés Velásquez, Venezuelan politician
Javier Velásquez (born 1960), prime minister of Peru
Nydia Velázquez, American politician
Ramón José Velásquez, ex-president of Venezuela (1993–1994)
Tracy Velazquez, American politician
Victoria Marina Velásquez (born 1943), Salvadoran jurist
Victoria Velasquez (born 1991), Danish politician

Religion
David Andrés Álvarez-Velázquez, Bishop of the Diocese of Puerto Rico
Rodrigo Arango Velásquez (1925–2008), Roman Catholic Bishop

Sports
Andrew Velazquez (born 1994), American professional baseball player
Arly Velásquez, Mexican Paralympic alpine skier
Alberto Velázquez (born 1934), Uruguayan cyclist
Cain Velasquez (born 1982), Mexican American mixed martial arts fighter
Carlos Velásquez (born 1984), Puerto Rican boxer
Carlos Velázquez (footballer) (born 1984), Mexican footballer
Carlos Velázquez (baseball) (1948–2000), Puerto Rican major league pitcher
Claudia Velásquez (born 1975), Peruvian swimmer
Claudio Velásquez (born 1986), Argentine football striker
Cornelio Velásquez (born 1968), Panamanian jockey
Édgar Velásquez (born 1974), Venezuelan boxer
Emiliano Velázquez (born 1994), Uruguayan football defender
Flor Velázquez (born 1984), Venezuelan judoka
Francisco Velázquez (born 1975), former Argentine roller hockey player
Frank Velásquez (born 1990), Salvadoran beach footballer
Freddie Velázquez, Dominican Republic baseball player
Gilberto Velásquez (born 1983), Paraguayan footballer
Guillermo Velasquez (baseball) (born 1968), Mexican baseball player
Héctor Velásquez (1952–2010), Chilean boxer
Héctor Velázquez (baseball) (born 1988), Mexican baseball player
Iván Velásquez (born 1976), Colombian boxer
Jorge Velásquez (born 1946), American horse racing jockey
José Velásquez (footballer, born 1952) (born 1952), retired football midfielder from Peru
José David Velásquez, Honduran footballer
Juan Velásquez (born 1971), Peruvian footballer
Julián Velásquez (born 1920), Argentine fencer
Juliana Velasquez (born 1986), Brazilian professional mixed martial artist
Luis Velásquez (1919–1997), Guatemalan long-distance runner
Manuel Velazquez, 20th-century anti-boxing activist
Marco Velásquez (born 1987), Chilean footballer
Miguel Velasquez (born 1944), Spanish boxer
Nelson Velázquez (born 1998), Puerto Rican baseball player
Sebastián Velásquez (born 1991), Colombian footballer
Sergio Velasquez (born 1952), American soccer player
Víctor Velásquez (born 1976), Salvadoran footballer
Vince Velasquez (born 1992), Major League Baseball pitcher
Wilfred Velásquez (born 1985), Guatemalan footballer
Wilmer Velásquez, Honduran football player

Other
Andrew Velasquez (born 1969), American civil servant
Baldemar Velasquez (born 1947), president of the Farm Labor Organizing Committee, AFL–CIO
Chico Velasquez (died 1854), Native American leader
Diego Velázquez de Cuéllar, Spanish conquistador leader of the conquest of Cuba
Fidel Velázquez Sánchez, 20th-century Mexican union leader
José Velásquez (explorer) (1717–1785), Spanish explorer
José Velásquez Bórquez (1833–1897), Chilean general
Juan Velázquez Tlacotzin, puppet ruler of the Aztec Empire (1525–26)
Lizzie Velásquez (born 1989), author and motivational speaker, she is the index case for Marfanoid–progeroid–lipodystrophy syndrome
Loreta Janeta Velázquez (1842–1923), writer and alleged soldier
María Sofía Velásquez (born 1989), Panamanian beauty pageant winner
Pablo Medina Velázquez ( 1961–2014), Paraguayan journalist
Richard Velazquez (born 1973), Tech Executive, Community Leader, First Puerto Rican designer for Porsche AG in Germany
René Velázquez Valenzuela (died 2016), Mexican suspected hitman
Ronny Velásquez (born 1951), Venezuelan anthropologist

See also
Velázquez, Uruguay, town in Uruguay
Velázquez Press, American publishing company
Velázquez (Madrid Metro), a station on Line 4

Spanish-language surnames
Surnames of Spanish origin
Patronymic surnames